The Silver Cross of the Roman Catholic Diocese of Žilina (slovak: Strieborný kríž Žilinskej diecézy) was founded by Mons. Tomáš Galis, a diocesan bishop, in 2018 on the occasion of the 10th Anniversary of the Establishment of the Diocese.

Description 
The award is set up in a single class and all laureates are enrolled in a special vital record. For the first time, the award was symbolically granted to nine laureates on February 9, 2018. The decoration consists of a 70 mm diameter medal and a 13 mm diameter wearable miniature. On the averse side of the medal there are the Cathedral of the Holy Trinity, Žilina and diocesan coat of arms displayed. On the reverse side of each medal there is the name of the laureate, the date of award and the serial number corresponding to the number of the relevant decree. The coat of arms of the Diocese is depicted on the etui. It is important that the medal has a wearable miniature that resembles a small jewel and it is a simplified miniature of the medal itself. This way the award can be also presented to the public. The award has the right to be presented only by the laureate.

Basic informations 
 Designer of the award: Marek Sobola
 Gypsum model: Branislav Ronai, The atelier of the Kremnica Mint
 Coinage: Kremnica Mint
 Material: Silver (Ag) 999/1000

Laureates

Awards on February 9, 2018 
 Alois Kothgasser, Archbishop emeritus of the Archdiocese of Salzburg (Austria)
 Ludwig Schwarz, bishop emeritus of the Diocese of Linz (Austria)
 Don Luciano Cappelli, diocesan priest of Crema (Italy)
 Mgr. Ivan Mahrik, parish priest of Korňa
 Ing. Anton Barcík, CEO of the Cement factory in Ladce
 Mgr. Peter Birčák, Director of the Diocesan Charity of Žilina
 Ing. Anna Kondelová, PhD. and Ing. Emil Kondela (husband and wife), Žilina 
 Ing. Mgr. Miriam Janegová, Director of the Diocesan School Office in Žilina
 Mgr. Juliana Burschiková, educationalist of Žilina

References 

Catholic Church in Slovakia